The 2005 Currie Cup (known as the ABSA Currie Cup for sponsorship reasons) was the 67th season in the South African Currie Cup competition since it started in 1889.

In a rematch of the 2004 final, the  reversed the result, coming from behind to defeat the  29–25 and win their first Currie Cup since 1976.

Qualification round

Competition
The fourteen provincial teams were divided in two equal strength sections (Section X and Section Y) according to the standings of the teams at the end of the 2004 competition.

All the teams played a single round of games within their section, meaning every team played six matches – three at home and three away.

Teams received four points for a win and two points for a draw. Bonus points were awarded to teams that scored 4 or more tries in a game, as well as to teams that lost a match by 7 points or less. Teams were ranked by points, then points difference (points scored less points conceded).

The top four teams in each section qualified to the Premier Division, while the bottom three teams in each section qualified to the First Division. No points from the qualifying round were carried over to the Premier Division or First Division.

Teams

Logs

Results

The following matches were played:

Section X

Round one

Round two

Round three

Round four

Round five

Round six

Round seven

Section Y

Round one

Round two

Round three

Round four

Round five

Round six

Round seven

Premier Division

Competition
The eight teams that qualified to the Premier Division remained in the same sections (Section X and Section Y) as they were during the qualifying round.

All the teams played a double round of games against teams in the other section, meaning every team played eight matches – four at home and four away.

Teams received four points for a win and two points for a draw. Bonus points were awarded to teams that scored 4 or more tries in a game, as well as to teams that lost a match by 7 points or less. Teams were ranked by points, then points difference (points scored less points conceded).

The top two teams in each section qualified to the title play-offs, where the section winners would have home advantage against the runners-up.

Teams

Logs

Results
The following fixtures were played:

Round one

Round two

Round three

Round four

Round five

Round six

Round seven

Round eight

Semi-finals

Final

Player Statistics
The following table contain only points which have been scored in competitive games in the 2005 Currie Cup Premier Division:

First Division

Competition
The six teams that qualified to the First Division remained in the same sections (Section X and Section Y) as they were during the qualifying round.

All the teams played a double round of games against teams in the other section, meaning every team played six matches – three at home and three away.

Teams received four points for a win and two points for a draw. Bonus points were awarded to teams that scored 4 or more tries in a game, as well as to teams that lost a match by 7 points or less. Teams were ranked by points, then points difference (points scored less points conceded).

The top two teams in each section qualified to the title play-offs, where the section winners would have home advantage against the runners-up in the same section.

Teams

Logs

Results
The following fixtures were played:

Round one

Round two

Round three

Round four

Round five

Round six

Semi-finals

Final

References

External links
 Currie Cup 2005 fixture and match reports

 
2005 in South African rugby union
2005 rugby union tournaments for clubs